St. James Catholic High School is a Grade 9 to 12 Catholic secondary school located in Guelph, Ontario  and is part of the Wellington Catholic District School Board.

History 

St. James was created in the 1950s as a junior high school for Catholic students but became a full high school in the mid-1980s. When the original Bishop Macdonell Catholic High School closed down in the mid-1990s, St. James inherited many of Bishop Mac's students along with Our Lady of Lourdes Catholic High School leading to a quick rise in school population and the subsequent construction of a new wing. Today, with the completion of the new Bishop Macdonell Catholic High School, most of the students come from the eastern and some northern parts of Guelph as well as from Wellington County.

See also
List of high schools in Ontario

References
Saint James Handbook
St. James History

External links 
 Wellington Catholic District School Board

Catholic secondary schools in Ontario
High schools in Guelph
Educational institutions established in 1952
1952 establishments in Ontario